Full Disclosure is a 2001 thriller film starring Fred Ward, Christopher Plummer, Rachel Ticotin and Penelope Ann Miller. It was directed by John Bradshaw.

Background
The film was shot in 1999. The release was delayed due to distributing problems.

Full Disclosure was nominated for 7 Video Premiere Awards in 2001: Best Actor (Ward), Best Supporting Actor (Plummer), Best Supporting Actress (Miller), Best Original Score, Best Live-Action Premiere, Best Screenplay and Best Director.

The film was released in United States, Canada, UK, Netherlands, Finland, China, France, Spain, Italy, Norway and in Greece (in 2008).

The Canadian working title was "All The Fine Lines".

Cast
 Fred Ward as John McWhirter
Andrew Kraulis as Young John McWhirter
 Christopher Plummer as Robert Lecker
 Rachel Ticotin as Armiti Khalq
 Penelope Ann Miller as Michelle 
 Virginia Madsen as Brenda Hopkins 
 Kim Coates as Dave Lewis 
 Roberta Maxwell as Sarah Archer
Audrey Lupke as Young Sarah Archer
 Nicholas Campbell as Simon Brauman
Coalhouse Campbell as Young Simon Brauman
 Dan Lauria as Clive Carter
 Patrick Gallagher as Larry Quinn
 Elisa Moolecherry as Jean
 Kevin Jubinville as Carl Smythe
 Yana McIntosh as Penny Mills
 Tyrone Benskin as FBI Special Agent Draper
 James Downing as FBI Agent 
 Yan Feldman as Ankash Barezai
 Will Corno as Syed Rakha
 A. Frank Ruffo as Frank Sommer
 Bill Lake as Del
 Roy Lewis as Reggie
 Danielle Wilson as Anne
 James Bulliard as Randy
 Hrant Alianak as Hosni
 Damon D'Oliveira as Marek
 James Purcell as Detective 
 Chris Makepeace as Pilot

External links
 

2001 films
English-language Canadian films
Girls with guns films
2001 thriller films
Films scored by Eric Robertson (composer)
Canadian thriller films
Films directed by John Bradshaw (director)
2000s English-language films
2000s Canadian films